The Duke–Maryland basketball rivalry is a dormant college basketball rivalry between the Duke Blue Devils men's basketball team of Duke University and Maryland Terrapins men's basketball team of the University of Maryland. The basketball series has been called one of the most intense intercollegiate rivalries of modern times by some. A Harris Interactive poll of Marylanders ranked it the third best in the state behind the Commanders–Cowboys and Ravens–Commanders rivalries in 2003 (before the Beltway Series of the Orioles and Nationals was possible). In 2014, Maryland left the ACC for the Big Ten and regular season games between Maryland and Duke are no longer scheduled regularly.

History
Duke University and the University of North Carolina consider each other to be their only rivals. However, during the early 2000s the Duke–Maryland games had national implications, including in 2001 where Duke and Maryland met in the Final Four.

The nature of the rivalry between Duke and Maryland is not viewed in the same manner by the schools' respective fans. While the Duke–UNC rivalry originated from geographic proximity and shared history, Duke fans do not view Maryland as a rival. However, several former Duke players have cited Maryland as the team against whom they played their most exciting games. Maryland fans traditionally see the Duke game as the biggest game of the year, as is true with most of Duke's opponents.  Maryland fans have often rioted in College Park after home games, regardless of the outcome.  Famously, one fan threw a bottle and hit Carlos Boozer's mother in her head after Duke's remarkable comeback from a 10-point deficit in the final minute to beat Maryland, requiring the University of Maryland to issue a public apology.  One year, most fans in the student section right behind the basket had to leave or turn their t-shirts inside-out because they had a FCC-banned explicative ("F**K DUKE") that could not be shown on television.  Michael Wilbon, a sports journalist who works for ESPN, was formerly a writer for The Washington Post, and owns a home in Bethesda, Maryland, refers to the Duke–Maryland rivalry as "[o]ne of the best rivalries in one of the best basketball leagues in the country." In 2014, the Washington Post produced a short documentary on the peak of the rivalry from 2001 and 2002 which included interviews with Coach Williams and several former players from both teams.

End of the rivalry
With the University of Maryland leaving the Atlantic Coast Conference to join the Big Ten Conference at the start of the 2014–15 academic year, the schools' basketball rivalry may come to an end. While Maryland competed in the ACC for the 2013–14 basketball season, the conference's expansion to a fifteen-team league means that schools do not play every league opponent twice during a given season. Duke and Maryland played one time during the 2013–14 season on February 15, 2014, at Duke's Cameron Indoor Stadium.  To some, including Duke basketball head coach Mike Krzyzewski, the emotion and spectacle that the Duke–Maryland rivalry brings to the ACC are "not going to be there for our conference and for Duke and Maryland anymore."

Game results

References

College basketball rivalries in the United States
Duke Blue Devils men's basketball
Maryland Terrapins men's basketball
Maryland Terrapins rivalries